Rosenbergia is a genus of longhorn beetles in the subfamily Lamiinae, close to the genus Batocera.

List of the described species and subspecies

 Rosenbergia bismarckiana Kriesche, 1920
 Rosenbergia breuningi Rigout, 1982
 Rosenbergia chaminadei Rigout, 2004
 Rosenbergia chicheryi Rigout, 1981
 Rosenbergia clarki Rigout, 1992
 Rosenbergia dankersi Rigout, 2004
 Rosenbergia darwini Casadio, 2008
 Rosenbergia denserugata Breuning, 1936
 Rosenbergia dianneae Allard, 1990
 Rosenbergia dianneae valentinae Rigout, 2004
 Rosenbergia drouini Rigout, 1992
 Rosenbergia ehrmanae Rigout, 1983
 Rosenbergia exigua Gahan, 1888
 Rosenbergia freneyi Rigout, 1988
 Rosenbergia gilmouri Rigout, 1982
 Rosenbergia hlaveki Rigout, 1992
 Rosenbergia hoyoisi Rigout, 1992
 Rosenbergia hudsoni Nylander, 2004
 Rosenbergia lactiflua Fairmaire, 1883
 Rosenbergia lepesmei Gilmour, 1960
 Rosenbergia mandibularis Ritsema, 1881
 Rosenbergia megalocephala van der Poll, 1886
 Rosenbergia porioni Rigout, 2004
 Rosenbergia porioni puspensatensis Rigout, 2004
 Rosenbergia rubra (Gilmour, 1966)
 Rosenbergia rubra fakfakensis (Rigout, 2004)
 Rosenbergia rufolineata Breuning, 1948
 Rosenbergia samuelsoni Rigout, 1982
 Rosenbergia schmitti Rigout, 1981
 Rosenbergia schneideri Rigout, 1994
 Rosenbergia scutellaris Aurivillius, 1924
 Rosenbergia straussi (Gestro, 1876)
 Rosenbergia umboi (Gilmour, 1960)
 Rosenbergia vetusta Ritsema, 1881
 Rosenbergia weiskei Heller, 1902

References

  1. Allard (V.), 1990 - Giagnose d'un nouveau Rosenbergia, Bulletin de la Société Sciences Nat, 66, p. 20
  2. Gilmour (F. E.), 1959 - Revision of the genus Rosenbergia Ritsema, Idea, Bogor, 12 (2-4), pp. 21–51
  3. Gilmour (F. E.), 1960 - Revision of the genus Rosenbergia Ritsema, Idea, Bogor, 13 (1-2), pp. 1–34
  4. Gilmour (F. E.), 1966 - Revision of the genus Rosenbergia Ritsema, Reichenbachia, 6 (30), pp. 247–261
  5. Nylander (U.), 2004, Description of a new species of the genus Rosenbergia from Papua New Guinea, Lambillionea, 104 (2), pp. 247–250
  6. Rigout (J.), 1981, Description de Rosenbergia nouveaux, Bulletin de la Société Sciences Nat, 28, pp. 21–22
  7. Rigout (J.), 1982, Description de nouveaux Rosenbergia, Miscellanea Entomologica, 49, pp. 53–55
  8. Rigout (J.), 1982, The Beetles of the World, volume 2, Sciences Nat, Venette 
  9. Rigout (J.), 1984, Notes sur le genre Rosenbergia, Bulletin de la Société Sciences Nat, 42, pp. 11–14
 10. Rigout (J.), 1988, Un Rosenbergia nouveau, Bulletin de la Société Sciences Nat, 58, p. 4
 11. Rigout (J.), 1992, Rosenbergia nouveaux, récents ou peu connus, Bulletin de la Société Sciences Nat, 75–76, p. 78, planche 11
 12. Rigout (J.), 1994, Nouveaux Batocerini, Bulletin de la Société Sciences Nat, 82, p. 4
 13. Rigout (J.), 2004, The Beetles of the World, volume 2, Supplement 1, Rosenbergia, Hillside Books, Canterbury 
 14. Van de Poll (N.), 1887, On the male of Rosenbergia megalocephala, Notes of the Leyden Museum, 9, p. 184

Batocerini